Gujarat Janata Congress (Gujarat Popular Congress) is a political party in the Indian state of Gujarat. GJC was launched by the Congress Chief Minister, Chhabildas Mehta on May 9, 2001. Another important leader of GJC is Indubhai Patel.

Indian National Congress breakaway groups
Political parties in Gujarat
2001 establishments in Gujarat
Political parties established in 2001